Abdul Latheeb Mohamed Aleem (born 10 August 1991) is a Sri Lankan international footballer who plays as a midfielder for Sri Lankan club Renown.

References

1991 births
Living people
Sri Lankan footballers
Association football midfielders
Renown SC players
Sri Lanka international footballers
Sri Lanka Football Premier League players